Arborescence is the fifth studio album by English band Ozric Tentacles. It was released in 1994 on Dovetail Records. The album was rereleased in 1999 on Snapper Music, this time with sleeve notes by Andy Garibaldi.  It is the last album to feature drummer Merv Pepler and keyboardist Joie Hinton as full-time bandmembers, who left to form Eat Static, until the live album Sunrise Festival in 2008.

Track listing
All tracks written by Ozric Tentacles, unless otherwise noted.

"Astro Cortex" – 5:22
"Yog-Bar-Og" – 9:42
"Arborescence" (Ed Wynne, Joie Hinton) – 4:52
"Al-Salooq" – 5:02
"Dance of the Loomi" – 5:15
"Myriapod" – 5:59
"There's a Planet Here" – 6:40
"Shima Koto" (Ed Wynne) – 6:25

Personnel
Ed Wynne – guitar, synth
Joie Hinton – synth
John Egan – flutes
Mervin Pepler – drums, percussion
Zia Geelani – bass

Charts

References

1994 albums
Ozric Tentacles albums
Snapper Music albums